Jaldak  (ترنک او جلدک ولسوالۍ) is a village in Tarnak Aw Jaldak District, Zabul Province, Afghanistan.
Jaldak is located at 31° 55' 32" North, 66° 31' 13" East and is at an altitude of 
1395m. The village is north west of Kandahar.

References

Populated places in Zabul Province